Mirosław is a Polish given name of Slavic origin, equivalent to Miroslav. It is composed of the elements miro 'peace' and sław 'glory, fame', thus a person who loves peace, or someone who achieves fame by establishing peace. 

Diminutive forms include Mirek and Mirka. Its feminine form is Mirosława.

Individuals with this name celebrate name day on February 26.

People and characters with the name Mirosław(a) 
Mirosław Ferić, a Polish fighter pilot, a flying ace of World War II
Mirosław Hermaszewski, the first Pole in space
Mirosława Makuchowska, Polish LGBT rights activist
Mirosław Vitali (1914–1992), Polish physician specialising in treatment and care of amputees
Mirosława Zakrzewska-Kotula,Polish volleyball, basketball and handball player and coach
Mirosław Żuławski, Polish writer, prosaist, diplomatist and screenwriter

See also 
 Mirosław (disambiguation)
 Miroslav (given name)

Polish masculine given names
Slavic masculine given names